Meng Xianshi (Chinese: 孟宪实; Pinyin: Mèng Xiànshí; born 1962) is a Chinese historian specialized in the history of Sui and Tang dynasties, an associate professor at Renmin University of China.

Biography
Meng Xianshi was born in Nehe, Heilongjiang.  He received his BA degree from Nankai University in 1983 and PhD degree from Beijing University in 2001. He joined the faculty of Renmin University of China in 2002.

Meng Xianshi gave lectures on Xuanwu Gate Incident on Lecture Room, a popular TV program on CCTV-10 in December 2006.  He is also a main editor of The Rise of the Tang Empire, a TV series.

In his speech in Beijing Foreign Studies University in 2010, he claimed that "Esperanto was created in the 1980s", which exposed his lack of academic preciseness.

Notes

External links
 Meng Xianshi's profile on the Website of Renmin University of China

1962 births
Living people
People's Republic of China historians
Academic staff of Renmin University of China
People from Qiqihar
Historians from Heilongjiang